In functional analysis and related areas of mathematics, a quasi-ultrabarrelled space is a topological vector spaces (TVS) for which every bornivorous ultrabarrel is a neighbourhood of the origin.

Definition 

A subset B0 of a TVS X is called a bornivorous ultrabarrel  if it is a closed, balanced, and bornivorous subset of X and if there exists a sequence  of closed balanced and bornivorous subsets of X such that Bi+1 + Bi+1 ⊆ Bi for all i = 0, 1, .... 
In this case,  is called a defining sequence for B0. 
A TVS X is called quasi-ultrabarrelled if every bornivorous ultrabarrel in X is a neighbourhood of the origin.

Properties 

A locally convex quasi-ultrabarrelled space is quasi-barrelled.

Examples and sufficient conditions 

Ultrabarrelled spaces and ultrabornological spaces are quasi-ultrabarrelled. 
Complete and metrizable TVSs are quasi-ultrabarrelled.

See also 

 Barrelled space
 Countably barrelled space
 Countably quasi-barrelled space
 Infrabarreled space
 Ultrabarrelled space
 Uniform boundedness principle#Generalisations

References 

 
  
 
   
   
   

Topological vector spaces